Collins J. Seitz Jr. (born September 14, 1957) is the chief justice of the Delaware Supreme Court.

Education 

Seitz received a Bachelor of Arts from the University of Delaware in 1980.  He earned his J.D. degree at the Villanova University School of Law and was admitted to the Delaware Bar in 1983.

Legal career 

Seitz served as managing partner of Connolly Bove Lodge & Hutz LLP, where he practiced for more than three decades. He was the founding partner of Seitz, Ross, Aronstam & Moritz LLP. In that capacity, he regularly litigated corporate, commercial, and intellectual property cases, and advised clients on issues of Delaware corporate law.

Delaware Supreme Court

Term as justice 

On February 23, 2015, Governor Jack Markell nominated Seitz to be a justice of the Delaware Supreme Court to the seat vacated by Henry du Pont Ridgely who retired on January 31, 2015. He was sworn in on April 14, 2015.

Chief justice 

On October 24, 2019, Governor John Carney announced Seitz as his nominee to be the next Chief Justice of the Delaware Supreme Court. On November 7, 2019, his nomination was confirmed unanimously by the Delaware Senate. He was sworn into office on November 8, 2019.

Personal life 
Seitz's sister is Virginia A. Seitz, an attorney who served as United States Assistant Attorney General for the Office of Legal Counsel from 2011 to 2013. His father is Collins J. Seitz, who served as a Judge on the United States Court of Appeals for the Third Circuit until his death in 1998.

References

|-

1957 births
21st-century American judges
Chief Justices of Delaware
Justices of the Delaware Supreme Court
Living people
University of Delaware alumni
Villanova University School of Law alumni